LocoRoco Midnight Carnival is a platform game developed and published by Sony Computer Entertainment for the PlayStation Portable. The game was released in 2009 as a PlayStation Network exclusive, and is a spin-off that continues the story of LocoRoco 2.

An emulated version of the game was released digitally for PS4/PS5 in July 2022 and got added to the PlayStation Plus Premium catalog of classics.

Plot 
LocoRoco Midnight Carnival is based on a secret carnival-like base, created by the BuiBui, a red, mischievous version of the MuiMui. The title shows that the LocoRoco were quietly sleeping, while in the background, a BuiBui pulls on a nearby lever (cleverly designed to just look like a star), opening a trapdoor under the LocoRoco, sending them into a chute, taking them into a cannon, which shows the LocoRoco "Boing!" power. The cannon sends the LocoRoco into the BuiBui's secret base, the midnight carnival.

LocoRoco Midnight Carnival MC 
This is the PSP ported version of Locoroco Midnight Carnival for the Xperia Play. It was available via PSN store  for Japanese Customers whom had purchased the NTT DoCoMo variant of Xperia Play. Code was sent to email after registering through the Campaign Navi application.

Legacy 
In PlayStation Home, an apartment space was released based on LocoRoco. The apartment space is called "Loco Island" and features different LocoRocos on the island and a shop where users can purchase different LocoRoco themed virtual items such as crowns and glasses. There's also a video screen advertising LocoRoco. It is one of the download-only PSP titles no longer available for purchase on PSP as a result of the PSP PlayStation Store closing on July 2, 2021. The game is currently available to download on the PSVita PlayStation Store. It was later re-released on PS4.

Reception 
LocoRoco Midnight Carnival received "mixed or average" reviews, according to review aggregator Metacritic.

References

2009 video games
Halloween video games
Platform games
PlayStation Portable games
Puzzle video games
Sony Interactive Entertainment games
Video games developed in Japan
PlayStation Portable-only games
PlayStation Network games
Single-player video games